Homethes is a genus of beetles in the family Carabidae, containing the following species:

 Homethes angulatus Blackburn, 1892 
 Homethes elegans Newman, 1842 
 Homethes gracilis Blackburn, 1892 
 Homethes guttifer Germar, 1848 
 Homethes marginipennis Macleay, 1871
 Homethes niger Sloane, 1920 
 Homethes rotundatus Blackburn, 1892
 Homethes sericeus (Erichson, 1842) 
 Homethes velutinus Macleay, 1871

References

Lebiinae